Bushey Fields Hospital is a psychiatric hospital located in Dudley, West Midlands, England managed by the Dudley and Walsall Mental Health Partnership NHS Trust.

History
The hospital is a small detached cabin-like building opened in 1983 at the same time as adjacent Russells Hall Hospital, and was expanded in the early 1990s to replace most of the remaining facilities at Burton Road Hospital, which closed in December 1993.

References

Hospital buildings completed in 1983
Psychiatric hospitals in England
Buildings and structures in Dudley
Hospitals in the West Midlands (county)
NHS hospitals in England